Aïn Taghrout District is a district of Bordj Bou Arréridj Province, Algeria.

Municipalities
The district is further divided into 2 municipalities:
Aïn Taghrout
Tixter 
 

Districts of Bordj Bou Arréridj Province